Men's downhill skiing events at the 2006 Winter Paralympics were contested at Sestriere on 11 & 12 March.

There were 3 events. Each was contested by skiers from a range of disability classes, and the standings were decided by applying a disability factor to the actual times achieved.

Visually impaired
The visually impaired event took place on 12 March. It was won by Gerd Gradwohl, representing .

Sitting
The sitting event took place on 12 March. It was won by Kevin Bramble, representing .

Standing
The standing event took place on 11 March. It was won by Gerd Schönfelder, representing .

References

M